Saint-Pal-de-Senouire (literally Saint-Pal of Senouire) is a commune in the Haute-Loire department in south-central France.

Geography
The Senouire flows south through the middle of the commune.

Population

See also
Communes of the Haute-Loire department

References

External links
 Website of Saint-Pal-de-Senouire
 Virtual visit of Saint-Pal-de-Senouire

Communes of Haute-Loire